Durrington High School is a Coeducational secondary school located in Worthing, West Sussex. The school operated as a high school between 1973 and 2015 as part of Worthing's three-tier provision. From September 2015 the school became a standard secondary for 11 – 16-year-olds. The school converted to academy status on 1 April 2014.

History
This senior school is the product of a merger in 1973 of two neighbouring schools, with their playing fields divided by a single white line: Worthing County Secondary School for Girls (Rodmell Road site) and Worthing Technical High School (Boulevard site).

The County Secondary School for Girls moved to the new brick-built Rodmell Road building in 1953 from the Sussex Road school with Miss Lilian Belchamber continuing as the head mistress until the creation of Durrington High School in 1973.

The Technical High moved to the Boulevard location in 1955 from Union Place Worthing and was renamed Worthing Technical High School (strictly speaking, it was renamed 'The Technical High School, Worthing' as it was a West Sussex institution rather than a Worthing one, and had a catchment area covering the whole of the West Sussex coastal area).

The school building has been rebuilt and extended considerably with the Technical High building demolished during the mid-1990s and sections of the Rodmell Road building still standing and extended.

Durrington High School continues to have the seahorse as their school crest which was the emblem of the County Secondary school.

In 2015, education provision in Worthing was reorganised into the standard two-tier provision, with Durrington increasing its roll by extending to take pupils in Year 7 who had previous attended the local middle schools.

Campus 
The school shares a campus with Oak Grove College Special School. The building is purpose-built, offering facilities for all subjects, including science labs, technology suites and a music department. There is also a large field in which cricket pitches and goal posts are set up, and a MUGA (Multi Use Games Arena) for 6 a-side leagues etc. In addition a large Astro turf was built in 2015 the size of a full hockey pitch with 2 hockey goals and 4 goal posts that are rented out. In these constructions a new pavilion was built with a small canteen for year 7 and 8 pupils and 2 new changing rooms.

In 2020 the school is currently undergoing new building work for a new sports hall as well as a update to the MUGA.

Theatre and Performing Arts

Durrington High School was represented in the West End with pupils performing in the production of "Fire Costs" at the Lyric Theatre, London, October 1993 – a performance that was produced by the Home Office. The production was originally presented at the Connaught Theatre, Worthing in the Autumn of 1991 and was the result of a competition run by West Sussex Fire Brigade in which local schoolchildren were encouraged to submit stories based on the subject of fire.

Companies 
Durrington High School pupils are divided into seven companies: Roddick, Shelley, Franklin, Mercator, Coubertin and Da Vinci. All of these are named after famous people devoted to a certain subject or subjects, e.g. Franklin: Science and Music. The purpose of the companies is to allow the younger and older students to bond together. The weekly company assembles include pupils from all years; replacing the traditional year group meetings, although sometimes there are year group meetings.

Notable former pupils 
Jonathan Sevink – fiddle player for band The Levellers.

References

External links 
 

Secondary schools in West Sussex
Buildings and structures in Worthing
Educational institutions established in 1973
1973 establishments in England
Academies in West Sussex